Jean-Francois Mayer (born 25 April 1957 in Fribourg, Switzerland) is a religious historian, translator in Switzerland, and Director of the Institute Religioscope.

He has a doctorate degree in History at the Jean Moulin University Lyon 3 (1984).

From 1991 to 1998, he worked as an analyst on international affairs and policy for the Swiss federal government. In 1999, he founded a firm of strategic researches named JFM Recherches et Analyses, and taught at the University of Freiburg from 1999 to 2007.

In 2007, Mayer founded the Institute Religioscope and became the director. He contributed in the writing of several magazines, including Politica Hermetica, Religioscope and Religion Watch.

His writing focuses on contemporary religious movements and cults, including Islam, the Unification Church, the Church of Scientology, the Order of the Solar Temple and the Pilgrims of Arès. He also published works about aliens and links between religion and the Internet.

Bibliography
This is a partial list of Mayer's works:
 La Nouvelle Église de Lausanne  et le mouvement swedenborgien en Suisse romande des origines à 1948, Zürich, Swedenborg Verlag, 1984.
 Sectes nouvelles. Un regard neuf ; preface by Émile Poulat, Paris, Éditions du Cerf, 1985.
 Les sectes. Non-conformismes chrétiens et nouvelles religions, 2nd edition, Paris, Éditions du Cerf/Saint Laurent (Québec), Fides, 1988.
 L'Évêque Bugnion ou les Voyages extraordinaires d'un aventurier ecclésiastique vaudois, Lausanne, Éditions 24 heures, 1989.
 Les mythes du Temple solaire, Genève. Georg, 1996.
 Confessions d'un chasseur de sectes, Paris, Éditions du Cerf, 1990.
 Les fondamentalismes, Genève, Georg, 2001.
 La naissance des nouvelles religions, with Reender Kranenborg, Georg Editeur, Geneva, 2004, 
 Internet et religion, Gollion, Infolio, 2008

References

1957 births
Living people
Swiss historians of religion
Swiss male writers
Researchers of new religious movements and cults
People from Fribourg